Dienerella is a genus of beetles in the family Latridiidae, containing the following species:

Species
D. acies Rücker, 1981
D. adelphia Rücker, 1984
D. aequalis (Reitter, 1878)
D. africana Dajoz, 1970
D. anatolica (Mannerheim, 1844)
D. angelinii Rücker, 1998
D. argus (Reitter, 1884)
D. beloni (Reitter, 1882)
D. besucheti Vincent, 1994
D. clathrata (Mannerheim, 1844)
D. corsica Vincent, 1990
D. costulata (Reitter, 1877)
D. crenicollis (Belon, 1885)
D. elegans (Aubé, 1850)
D. falliana (Sharp, 1902)
D. filiformis (Gyllenhal, 1827)
D. filum (Aubé, 1850)
D. grouvellei (Belon, 1897)
D. huguettae Vincent, 1991
D. intermedia (Belon, 1884)
D. kashmirensis (Sen Gupta, 1976)
D. kerzhneri V. A. Tsinkevich, 2007
D. laevithorax (Belon, 1895)
D. laticeps (Reitter, 1884)
D. lurida Rücker, 1983
D. marginata Rücker, 1983
D. navicula Rücker, 1986
D. oeceticola Brèthes, 1922
D. ovata (Sen Gupta, 1976)
D. parilis (Rey, 1889)
D. perpusilla (Walkley, 1858)
D. pilifera (Reitter, 1875)
D. ruficollis (Marsham, 1802)
D. schueppeli (Reitter, 1881)
D. separanda (Reitter, 1887)
D. siciliana Vincent, 1990
D. spinigera Rücker, 1986
D. sucina Rücker, 1986
D. vincenti Johnson, 2007

References

Latridiidae genera
Taxa named by Edmund Reitter